Bettmeralp is a municipality in the district of Raron in the canton of Valais in Switzerland.  On 1 January 2014 the former municipalities of Betten and Martisberg merged into the municipality of Bettmeralp. Before the merger, Bettmeralp was the name of a village and ski resort in Betten.

Bettmeralp village

Bettmeralp is a car free village which can be reached by cable car from the Betten train station (Matterhorn Gotthard Bahn). From there another cable car leads near to the summit of Bettmerhorn, which lies directly above the Aletsch Glacier. Bettmersee is located above the village at 2006 m.

The position of Bettmeralp allows good view over the Pennine Alps, particularly the summits of Weissmies, Dom, Matterhorn and Weisshorn.

History
Betten is first mentioned in 1243 as Bettan. Martisberg is first mentioned in 1311 as Martisperg.

Geography

Demographics

Historic population
The historical population is given in the following chart:

Sights
The entire hamlet of Eggen is designated as part of the Inventory of Swiss Heritage Sites.

Skilift system
Bettmeralp village can only be reached via a cable car. The main ski lifts are:

Panorama 
The village:

View from the village:

References

External links

 
 
Official website

Municipalities of Valais
Villages in Valais
Ski areas and resorts in Switzerland
Car-free villages in Switzerland